Bifascicular block is a conduction abnormality in the heart where two of the three main fascicles of the His/Purkinje system are blocked.

Most commonly, it refers to a combination of right bundle branch block (RBBB) and either left anterior fascicular block (LAFB) or left posterior fascicular block (LPFB), with the former being more common.

Some authors consider left bundle branch block (LBBB) to be a technical bifascicular block, since the block occurs above the bifurcation of the left anterior and left posterior fascicles of the left bundle branch.

Diagnosis

Diagnostic criteria:

Clinically, bifascicular block presents with one of two ECG patterns:

Right bundle branch block (RBBB) with left anterior fascicular block (LAFB), manifested as left axis deviation (LAD).

RBBB and left posterior fascicular block (LPFB), manifested as right axis deviation (RAD) in the absence of other causes.

Treatment
In those with bifascicular block and no symptoms, little with respect to treatment is needed. In those with syncope, a pacemaker is recommended.

References

Olshansky B. Bradyarrhythmias – Conduction System Abnormalities. In: Arrhythmia Essentials 2e, 2017.
Vijayaraman P. Clinical Cardiac Pacing, Defibrillation and Resynchronisation Therapy 5e, 2017
Goldberger A. Ventricular Conduction Disturbances.. In: Goldberger’s Clinical Electrocardiography 9e, 2018.

External links 

Cardiac arrhythmia